Studio 10,001 was an international film studio formed in 1963 by exploitation filmmaker Kroger Babb.  With a headquarters in Beverly Hills, California, it had a presence in the United States, Europe, New Zealand, and Australia and presented such films as Kipling's Women and the Rue McClanahan film Five Minutes to Love.

References
 ''BoxOffice: "Kroger Babb Forms New Distributing Co." 24 July 1963.

Film production companies of the United States